Eurus Ridge is a ridge between Cerberus Valley and Clio Glacier in the Olympus Range of the McMurdo Dry Valleys of Antarctica. In association with other names from Greek mythology grouped in this area, it was named by the New Zealand Geographic Board (1998) after Eurus, the mythological god of the east wind.

References 

Ridges of Victoria Land
Scott Coast